Norbert Pienta (born 1952) is an American chemist currently Professor at University of Georgia and editor-in-chief of American Chemical Society's Journal of Chemical Education. His current interests are browser web education research and tutorial and education in schools. He is currently retired.

Education
He earned his B.S. from University of Rochester in 1974 and his Ph.D. degree from University of North Carolina in 1978.

Selected publications
 Linear solvation energy relationships. 7. Correlations between the solvent-donicity and acceptor-number scales and the solvatochromic parameters .pi.*, .alpha., and .beta.
 Photochemistry of alkyl halides. 4. 1-Norbornyl, 1-norbornylmethyl, 1-and 2-adamantyl, and 1-octyl bromides and iodides, Paul J Kropp, Graham S Poindexter, Norbert J Pienta, David C Hamilton, Journal of the American Chemical Society, 1976.

References

1952 births
Living people
21st-century American chemists
University of Georgia faculty
University of North Carolina alumni
University of Rochester alumni